The Deputy Judge Advocate General of the Army (DJAG) is the second highest ranking JAG officer and lawyer in the United States Army. 
Similar to the Judge Advocate General of the United States Army (TJAG), the DJAG is appointed by the president with the advice and consent of the senate.  Upon appointment to the office of DJAG, the appointee, if they hold a lower rank, will be promoted to the rank of major general.

U.S. Army Deputy Judge Advocates General

See also
 Judge Advocate General of the United States Army

References

United States Army Judge Advocate General's Corps
Deputy J